The Karel Havlíček Monument is an outdoor monument and sculpture by Joseph Strachovsky commemorating Karel Havlíček Borovský, installed in the median of East Solidarity Drive, in Chicago's Northerly Island, in the U.S. state of Illinois. The statue was created in 1911 and installed in 1983.

See also

 List of public art in Chicago

References

External links
 

1911 sculptures
Cultural depictions of Czech men
Monuments and memorials in Chicago
Outdoor sculptures in Chicago
Sculptures of men in Illinois
Statues in Chicago
Statues of writers